Marina Rajčić née Vukčević, (born 24 August 1993) is a Montenegrin handball goalkeeper for Siófok KC and the Montenegrin national team.

She is married to Vladimir Rajčić.

Achievements
Montenegrin Championship:
Winner: 2010, 2011, 2012, 2013, 2014, 2015, 2019, 2021
Montenegrin Cup:
Winner: 2010, 2011, 2012, 2013, 2014, 2015, 2019, 2021
Women's Regional Handball League:
Winner: 2010, 2011, 2012, 2013, 2014, 2015, 2019
Junior World Championship:
Bronze Medalist: 2010
France Championship:
Winner: 2016, 2017, 2018 
 French Cup: 
Winner: 2017
EHF Champions League
Winner: 2012, 2015
Women's EHF Cup Winners' Cup: 
Winner: 2010

Individual awards
 All-Star Goalkeeper of the Junior World Championship: 2010

References

External links

Profile on ŽRK Budućnost Podgorica

1993 births
Living people
Sportspeople from Podgorica
Montenegrin female handball players
Olympic silver medalists for Montenegro
Olympic medalists in handball
Olympic handball players of Montenegro
Handball players at the 2012 Summer Olympics
Handball players at the 2016 Summer Olympics
Handball players at the 2020 Summer Olympics
Medalists at the 2012 Summer Olympics
Expatriate handball players
Montenegrin expatriate sportspeople in France